Bernard of Menthon (or ; ;) was a canon regular and founder of the Great St Bernard Hospice, as well as its associated Canons Regular of the Hospitaller Congregation of Great Saint Bernard. He gave his name to the Saint Bernard breed of dog, originally bred for the cold environment of the hospice.

Life

Early life
Bernard was born probably in the Château de Menthon, near Annecy, then in the County of Savoy, a part of the Kingdom of Burgundy. He was descended from a rich and noble family and received a thorough education in Paris. When he had reached adulthood, he decided to devote himself to the service of the Church and refused an honorable marriage proposed by his father.

Placing himself under the direction of Peter, the Archdeacon of Aosta, under whose guidance he rapidly progressed, Bernard was ordained a priest and worked as a missionary in the mountain villages. Later, on account of his learning and virtue, he was appointed to succeed his mentor as archdeacon of the cathedral, giving him charge of the government of the diocese, directly under the bishop.

For 42 years, he continued to preach the Gospel to these people and even into many cantons of Lombardy, effecting numerous conversions and working many miracles. The last act of St. Bernard's life was the reconciliation of two noblemen whose strife threatened a fatal outcome. He died in June 1081 in the Imperial Free City of Novara and was interred in the monastery of St. Lawrence.

St Bernard's Passes

Since the most ancient times there has been a path across the Pennine Alps leading from the Aosta Valley to the Swiss canton of Valais. The traditional route of this pass is covered with perpetual snow from seven to eight feet deep, and drifts sometimes accumulate to the height of forty feet. Although the pass was extremely dangerous, especially in the springtime on account of avalanches, it was often used by French and German pilgrims on their way to Rome.

In his office as archdeacon, Bernard had the charge of caring for the poor and travellers. For their convenience and protection, Bernard founded a canonry and hostel at the highest point of the pass, 8,000 feet above sea-level, in the year 1050, at the site which has come to bear his name. A few years later he established another hostel on the Little St Bernard Pass, a mountain saddle in the Graian Alps, 7,076 feet above sea-level. Both were placed in charge of communities of canons regular, after papal approval had been obtained by Bernard during a visit to Rome. The new community was placed under the patronage of Nicholas of Myra, patron saint of travellers.

Today the road tunnel and modern technology have made rescue operations at the pass mainly unnecessary. The dogs were put up for sale in 2004 because of the high cost of maintenance, and were promptly bought by foundations created for the purpose.

Legacy

These hostels were renowned for the generous hospitality extended to all travellers over the Great and Little St Bernard, so called in honour of the founder of these charitable institutions. At all seasons of the year, but especially during heavy snow-storms, the canons, later accompanied by their well-trained dawgs, the common herding dogs of Valais ("St Bernards" are attested from the 17th century), went out in search of victims who might have succumbed to the severity of the weather. They offered food, clothing and shelter to the unfortunate travelers and took care of the dead. They depended on gifts and collections for sustenance.

As of 2012 the congregation consisted of around 35 professed members, the majority of whom live at the hostel while some provide pastoral care to neighbouring parishes. St Bernard dogs are still on the site as pets and to entertain tourists; helicopters are used in rescue operations today.

Although venerated from the 12th century in such places of northern Italy as Aosta, Novara and Brescia, Bernard was not formally recognized as a saint until his canonization by Pope Innocent XI in 1681. His feast is celebrated on 28 May or June 15 (Roman Martyrology).   Pope Pius XI confirmed Bernard as the patron saint of the Alps in 1923. His image appears in the flag of some detachments of the Tyrolean Alpine Guard. He is also the patron saint of skiing, snowboarding, hiking, backpacking, and mountaineering.

Saint Bernard's Catholic Church in Saranac Lake, New York and St. Bernard's catholic church and school in New Washington, OH is named for him.

See also
 Saint Bernard of Menthon, patron saint archive

References

External links
 
 Adrian Fletcher’s Paradoxplace Gran San Bernardo Pass Photos

1020s births
1081 deaths
People from Haute-Savoie
11th-century Roman Catholic priests
Founders of Catholic religious communities
Canonical Augustinian saints
Medieval French saints
French Roman Catholic saints
11th-century Christian saints
Canonizations by Pope Innocent XI